Merolino Sikirevačko is an uninhabited settlement in Croatia, located in Municipality of Strizivojna in Osijek-Baranja County. It is located near river Biđ, in a forest, around 7 km west of Strizivojna.

Ghost towns in Croatia